This list, of art makers who are considered Outsider artists, includes self-taught, visionary art and naïve art makers known for the creation of artworks that are primarily visual in nature such as drawings, paintings, sculptures, and visionary environments. The entries are in alphabetical order by surname. Birth and death dates are included.


A B C D E F G H I J K L M N O P Q R S T U V W X Y Z

A
 Adolphe Julian Fouéré (1839–1910), France 
 Jesse Aaron (1887–1979), United States
 Gayleen Aiken (1934–2005), United States
 Pearl Alcock (1934–2006), United Kingdom
 Consuelo González Amezcua (1903–1975), United States
 Eugene Andolsek (1921–2008), United States
 Eddie Arning (1898–1993), United States
 James Arnold (1927–1999), United States
Nellie Ashford (born c. 1943), United States

B
 Eldren Bailey (1903–1987), United States
 Carol Bailly (born 1955), United States/Switzerland
 Michael Banks (born 1972), United States
 Julie Bar (1868–1930), Switzerland
 Juliette Élisa Bataille (1896–?), France
 Daniel Belardinelli (born 1961), United States
 Charles Benefiel (born 1967), United States
 Deborah Berger (1956–2005), United States
 Dorothy Berry (born 1942), Australia
 Gregory Blackstock (1946–2023), United States
 Josef Blahaut (born 1922), Austria
 Nick Blinko (born 1961), United Kingdom
 Ursula Schultze-Bluhm (1921–1999), Germany
 Thérèse Bonnelalbay (1931–1980), France
 Marguerite Burnat-Provins (1872–1952), France
 Richard Burnside (1944–2020), United States
 Vernon Burwell (1916–1990), United States
 Gladwyn Bush (1914–2003), Cayman Islands
 Hawkins Bolden (1914–2005), United States

C
 Al Carbee (1914–2005), United States
 Benny Carter (1943–2014), United States
 James Castle (1899–1977), United States
 Gaston Chaissac (1910–1964), France
 Tsang Tsou Choi (1921–2007), Hong Kong
 Nek Chand (1924–2015), Pakistan
 Ferdinand Cheval (1836–1924), France
 Felipe Jesus Consalvos (1891–1960), Cuba/United States
 Sylvia Convey (born 1948), Germany/Australia
 Aloïse Corbaz (1886–1964), Switzerland
 Joseph Crépin (1875–1948), France
 María Ángeles Fernández Cuesta (La Pinturitas) (born 1950), Spain

D
 Henry Darger (1892–1973), United States
 Sylvette David (born 1934) France
 Charles Dellschau (1830–1923) Prussia/United States
 Mike Disfarmer (1884–1959), United States  
 Thornton Dial (1928–2016), United States
 Sam Doyle (1906–1985), United States
Vestie Davis (1903–1978), United States

E
 William Edmondson (1870–1951), United States
 Eli Jah (born circa 1950), Jamaica
 Minnie Evans (1892–1987), United States

F
 Howard Finster (1916–2001), United States
 Auguste Forestier (1887–1958)
 Alois Fischbach (1926–1981), Austria
 Johann Fischer (born 1919), Austria
 Louise Fischer (1896–1987), France
 Wes Freed (1964-2022), United States

G
 Johann Garber (born 1947), Austria
 Carl Genzel (1871–1925)
 Madge Gill (1882–1961), United Kingdom
 Lee Godie (1909–1994), United States
 Helga Goetze (1922–2008), Germany
 Paul Goesch (1885–1940), Germany
 Grace Bashara Greene (1928–2004), United States

H
 Adelaide Hall(c. 1862–1945), United States
 James Hampton (1909–1964), United States
 Alyne Harris (born 1942), United States 
 Emma Hauck (1878–1930), Germany
 Johann Hauser (1926–1996), Austria
 Magali Herrera (1914–1992), Uruguay
 Lonnie Holley (born 1950), United States
 Annie Hooper (1897–1986), United States
 Jesse Howard (1885–1983), United States
 L.V. Hull (1942-2008), United States
 Clementine Hunter (1886–1988), United States

J
 Mercedes Jamison (1933–1997), United States
 Jandek (born 1945), United States
 Mary Jewels (1886–1977), United Kingdom
 Daniel Johnston (1961–2019), United States

K
 John Urho Kemp (1942-2010), United States
 Richard Gordon Kendall (1933–2008), United States
 Susan Te Kahurangi King (born 1951), New Zealand
 Norbert Kox (1945–2018), United States

L
 Helen LaFrance (1919-2020), United States
 Damian Le Bas (1963–2017), United Kingdom
 Augustin Lesage (1876–1954), France
 Joe Light (1934–2005), United States
 Ronald Lockett (1965–1998), United States
 Séraphine Louis (1864–1942), France
Claudine Loquen (born 1965), France
 Marzio Lowe (born 1989), Italy

M
 Vivian Maier (1926-2009), United States
 Helen Martins (1897–1976), South Africa
 Malcolm McKesson (1910–1999), United States
 Gustav Mesmer (1903–1994), Germany
 Joe Minter (born 1943), United States
 Farouq Molloy (born 1957), United Kingdom
 Sister Gertrude Morgan (1900–1980), United States
 John B. Murray (1908–1998), United States

P
 Philadelphia Wireman, United States
  (born 1961), Thailand
 Laure Pigeon (1882–1965), France
 Tressa "Grandma" Prisbrey (1896–1988), United States
 Mary Proctor (born 1960), United States
 Noah Purifoy (1917–2004), United States

R
 Martín Ramírez (1895–1963), Mexico/United States
 Royal Robertson (1930–1997), United States
 Simon Rodia (1879–1965), Italy/United States
 Juanita Rogers (1934–1985), United States
 Nellie Mae Rowe (1900–1982), United States

S
 Ody Saban (born 1953), Turkey/United States
 Eugenio Santoro (1920–2006), Italy/Switzerland
 Nathan Schiff, United States 
 Judith Scott (1943–2005), United States
 Emmer Sewell (born 1934), United States
 Vollis Simpson (1919–2013), United States
 Marguerite Sir (1890–1957) France 
 Julia Sisi (born 1957), Argentina/France 
 Mary T. Smith (1904–1995), United States 
 Georgia Speller (1931–1988), United States
 Lee Steen (1897–1975), United States
 Jimmy Lee Sudduth (1910–2007), United States
 Robert Sundholm (born 1941), United States
 Barbara Symmons (born 1936), United Kingdom

T
 Claire Teller (born 1928), United Kingdom
 Jeanne Thomarat (1893–1985), Canada
 Mose Tolliver (1921–2006), United States
 Pauline Tollet, United Kingdom
 Jeanne Tripier (1869–1944), France

U
 Shafique Uddin (born 1962), United Kingdom

V
 Eugene Von Bruenchenhein (1910–1983), United States
Pierre Vuitton, France (1880–1962)

W
 August Walla (1936–2001), Austria
 Mary Ann Willson (active approximately 1810 to 1825), United States
 Scottie Wilson (1888–1972), United Kingdom
 Jane Winkelman (1949–2012), United States
 Anna Aleric Watts (1824–1884), United Kingdom
 Adolf Wölfli (1864–1930), Switzerland

Y
 Brooks Yeomans (born 1957), United States
 Joseph Yoakum (1890–1972), United States
 Purvis Young (1943–1990), United States

Z
 Anna Zemánková (1908–1986), Austria
 Carlo Zinelli (1916–1974), Italy

References

External links
INTUIT: The Center for Intuitive and Outsider Art
Creative Growth Art Center
Souls Grown Deep

Outsider artists
Outsider artists